is a 1987 Japanese black comedy film by director Shohei Imamura. It was entered into the 1987 Cannes Film Festival. The film was selected as the Japanese entry for the Best Foreign Language Film at the 60th Academy Awards, but was not accepted as a nominee.

Plot 
The film tells the story of Iheiji Muraoka, who built brothels for the Japanese military.

Cast

 Ken Ogata as Iheiji Muraoka
 Mitsuko Baisho as Shiho
 Bang-ho Cho as Komashitai
 Yuki Furutachi
 Shino Ikenami as Tome
 Kozo Ishii as Kumai
 Satoko Iwasaki
 Kurenai Kanda as Otsuno
 Choichiro Kawarazaki as Kunikura
 Chun Hsiung Ko as Wang (as Chun-Hsiung Ko)
 Hiroyuki Konishi as Uehara
 Mami Kumagaya as Kino
 Leonard Kuma as Shop owner
 Norihei Miki as Tomonaga
 Sanshō Shinsui as Chota
 Tetta Sugimoto as Genkichi
 Minori Terada as Hisamitsu
 Taiji Tonoyama as Shimada
 Fujio Tsuneta as Nishiyama
 Kimiko Yoshimiya as Takeyo

See also
 List of submissions to the 60th Academy Awards for Best Foreign Language Film
 List of Japanese submissions for the Academy Award for Best Foreign Language Film

References

External links 
 

1987 films
1980s black comedy films
Films about prostitution in Japan
Films directed by Shohei Imamura
1980s Japanese-language films
Toei Company films
1987 comedy films
1980s Japanese films